Richard Water (died 1416 or after) of Canterbury, Kent, was an English politician and lawyer.

Family
Water married, before September 1395, a woman named Margery.

Career
Water was a Member of Parliament for Canterbury, Kent in 1406, 1407 and April 1414.

References

Year of birth missing
People from Canterbury
English MPs 1406
1416 deaths
English MPs 1407
English MPs April 1414